(born November 12, 1984) is a retired Japanese backstroke swimmer; she announced her retirement from competitions in early December 2013.

She is married to former swimmer Daisuke Hosokawa.

Major achievements
 2001 World Aquatics Championships – 200m backstroke 8th (2:14.12)
 2002 Pan Pacific Swimming Championships – 200m backstroke 2nd (2:12.28)
 2004 Athens Olympics – 200m backstroke 8th (2:12.90)
 2012 London Olympics – 100m backstroke 3rd BRONZE (58.83)

Personal bests
In long course
 50m backstroke: 27.73 Japanese Record (July 29, 2009)
 100m backstroke: 58.83 (April 17, 2009)
 200m backstroke: 2:09.27 (April 19, 2009)

In short course
 50m backstroke: 26.40 Asian, Japanese Record (February 15, 2009)

References

External links
 Profile – JOC

1984 births
Living people
Olympic swimmers of Japan
Japanese female backstroke swimmers
Swimmers at the 2004 Summer Olympics
Swimmers at the 2012 Summer Olympics
Sportspeople from Osaka
World Aquatics Championships medalists in swimming
Olympic bronze medalists for Japan
Olympic bronze medalists in swimming
Asian Games medalists in swimming
Swimmers at the 2002 Asian Games
Swimmers at the 2010 Asian Games
Medalists at the 2012 Summer Olympics
Female backstroke swimmers
Universiade medalists in swimming
Asian Games silver medalists for Japan
Asian Games bronze medalists for Japan
Medalists at the 2002 Asian Games
Medalists at the 2010 Asian Games
Universiade gold medalists for Japan
Medalists at the 2003 Summer Universiade
Medalists at the 2005 Summer Universiade
Medalists at the 2007 Summer Universiade